Government College of Engineering and Research, Avasari Khurd (GCOEARA) is a Maharashtra state government engineering college. It was established in 2009. The college is located about 62 km north of Pune (Shivaji nagar), on Nashik-Pune National Highway (NH-60) and 70 km from the shrine Bhimashankar. The campus is spread over 50 acres with academic buildings and separate administrative and workshop buildings, a separate residential zone with quarters for faculty and staff and hostels. The college is approved by All India Council for Technical Education, New Delhi, and is affiliated to Savitribai Phule Pune University. Directorate of Technical Education, Maharashtra state, Mumbai controls the institute through its regional office at Pune.

The college hosted the national level technical event ABINITIO. The college is mostly familiar as GCOEARA among students and locals.

Departments

Computer engineering 
The Computer Engineering department was established in 2009. The department has a student level organization name COMPSA organizes a different program. The department also has a club called Hackathon Club started in 2018.

Mechanical engineering 
The mechanical department was established in 2009. Many students graduate to work in companies such as Volkswagen. Students who crack the GATE exam go for higher studies at Indian Institutes of Technology and NIT.

Civil engineering 
This department started in 2010. Students qualify for GATE and other competitive examinations like MPSC, IES, etc. Many students win prizes at national technical events.

Electronics and telecommunications  
The department of Electronics and Telecommunication was established in the 2009-2010 academic year. The student organization ETSA works for students. E-Yantra is a student group that participated in the IIT Bombay competition. Also regular workshops and seminars are carried out.

Automobile engineering 
The department of Automotive Engineering was started in academic year 2009-2010. A separate full-fledged Vehicle Maintenance and Testing laboratory was developed. laboratories like I.C. Engine, Metrology & Quality Control, Vehicle Maintenance Practices, CAD and Emission Control are available.

Instrumentation and control  
The department of Instrumentation and Control was established in the 2009-2010 or the 2010-2011 academic year. This department has a student organization, workshop and seminars.

Student life

Team Abhedya (Robotics Research Lab of GCOEARA) 
Team Abhedya is a group of robotics enthusiasts who have been fabricating robots since 2014.  The club has participated in ABU- Robocon, an international robotic contest, for last six years. The national level competition (Robocon India) of ABU Robocon is being organised by Doordarshan and the winner of this national level competition gets the chance to represent India at the international level. Team Abhedya was ranked 6th in DD Robocon 2021 Online Festival & ranked 5th in DD Robocon 2022 which was held in Indian Institute of Technology Delhi.

Facilities

Boys hostels 
The college's two boys hostels are Sinhgad and Shivneri. They host 360 students. The hostel building is 3200 sq. meters and has four floors, 48 rooms, two recreation halls, a waiting area on each floor, and study. Admissions are based on merit and according to the reservation rules given by the Government of Maharashtra. Admission fees are Rs. 550/- (government fee) and Rs. 600/- (non government fee) excluding the mess charges.

Girls hostels 
The college has one girls hostel. It has a capacity of 230 students. The hostel building is 3200 sq. meters and has four floors, 48 rooms, four computer halls, three recreation halls, a waiting area on each floor, and study spaces. Hostel admissions are based on merit and follow government rules availability. Admission fees are Rs. 550/- (government fee) and Rs. 600/- (non government fee) excluding mess charges.

Gymkhana 
Gymkhana plays an important role in student development. The gymkhana department is equipped with state of the art sports equipment. Gymkhana organizes events every year.

 Street play competition on Independence day (15 August)
 Marathon on National Sports Day (29 August)
 Blood donation camp on Engineering Day (15 September)
 COMBACT: Interdepartmental sports event
 RESONANCE: Cultural event

Library 
The library is part of the administrative building, covering 250 sq. m., including separate periodicals/magazine section and reading rooms. It has reprographics facilities and internet access. Each department also has its own departmental library.

The book bank scheme of social welfare department is available for students from scheduled caste and scheduled tribes.

It also provides a digital library.

A reading room is available during college hours. Two reading rooms offer capacity for 100 students.

The college library subscribes to seven newspapers, four in Marathi and three in English.

Entrepreneurship Development and Start Up Center (EDSUC) 
The Entrepreneurship Development and Start Up Centre (EDSUC) is a non-profit student's organization dedicated to promoting and building entrepreneurship among students. It was established in 2018 under the aegis of Innovation, Incubation and Entrepreneurship Development cell of "Government College of Engineering and Research, Avasari (khurd)".

Admissions 
The college is under the Government of Maharastra. Admission process follows the MHT-CET cap round process. This whole process held under the DTE.

Technical clubs 

 Robotics Research Lab
 Sahyadri Formula Racers
 Hackathon
 Baja
 Go-Kart
 E-yantra
 Culture Club
 Hackathon Club
 College Magzine Club

See also 
Other government engineering colleges (GECs) in Maharashtra

 Government College of Engineering, Nagpur
 College of Engineering, Pune
 Government College of Engineering, Aurangabad
 Government College of Engineering, Chandrapur
 Government College of Engineering, Karad
 Government College of Engineering, Amravati
 Shri Guru Gobind Singhji Institute of Engineering and Technology, Nanded
 Veermata Jijabai Technological Institute, Mumbai,
 Walchand College of Engineering, Sangli

References

External links
 

Education in Pune district